Judge Arnold may refer to:

Morris S. Arnold (born 1941), judge of the United States Court of Appeals for the Eighth Circuit
Richard S. Arnold (1936–2004), judge of the United States Court of Appeals for the Eighth Circuit
Thurman Arnold (1891–1969), judge of the United States Court of Appeals for the District of Columbia
William W. Arnold (1877–1957), judge of the United States Tax Court

See also
Justice Arnold (disambiguation)